Cassandra Danielle Harberts (born June 4, 1992) is a former college and professional basketball player who was drafted by the Atlanta Dream of the WNBA and played a year in the Australian WNBL.

College
Harberts was coached by Michael Cooper her first three seasons at University of Southern California (USC) and by Cynthia Cooper-Dyke for her senior year. When she left USC, she was the teams number 7 all-time leader in points scored, number 8 all-time rebounder, and number 3 all-time in free throws made.

USC  statistics

Source

Post College Basketball
Harberts was drafted 20th  in the 2014 WNBA Draft by the Atlanta Dream (coached by her former college coach Michael Cooper) but failed to make the team. She played in the 2014–2015  WNBL  season for the West Coast Waves.

Personal life
Harberts has two brothers, Steven and Daniel, and has parents named Craig and Dorothy.

See also
USC Trojans women's basketball

References

External links
WNBA.com: Cassie Harberts profile
USC Trojans bio

1992 births
Living people
American women's basketball players
Atlanta Dream draft picks
Basketball players from California
Forwards (basketball)
Parade High School All-Americans (girls' basketball)
People from Laguna Hills, California
USC Trojans women's basketball players